The Secret Life of the American Teenager is a television series that created by Brenda Hampton. It first aired on ABC Family on July 1, 2008 in the United States. The show was renewed for a second season consisting of 24 episodes on February 9, 2009, which began airing on June 22, 2009. It started airing its 25 episode third season on June 7, 2010. On January 10, 2011, The Secret Life of the American Teenager was renewed for a third season along with a second season of the ABC Family hit show, Pretty Little Liars. Both shows are tentatively scheduled for a summer run. The first volume of season one is available on DVD in Regions 1 and 4, while the remaining DVDs are only available in Regions 1. Since the series premiered, it has averaged 3 million viewers per episode.

The Secret Life of the American Teenager focuses on the relationships between families and friends and how they deal with the unexpected teenage pregnancy of character Amy Juergens, who is portrayed by Shailene Woodley.

A total of 121 episodes of The Secret Life of the American Teenager have aired over five seasons, between July 1, 2008 and June 3, 2013.

Series overview

Episodes

Season 1 (2008–2009)

Season 2 (2009–2010)

Season 3 (2010–2011)

Season 4 (2011–2012)

Season 5 (2012–2013)

Home media
Each Secret Life season is released on DVD in separate volumes. Season one, confusingly, is sold as "season one" and "season two". Season two is sold as "volume three" and "volume four". Season one, volume one has been released in Regions 1 and 4, while season one, volume two, season two, volumes one and two have been released only in Region 1. The season one DVD was released in Australia on December 1, 2009, and a future Blu-ray format was planned for release.

References

External links
Episodes: ABC Family official site
Episode List at MSN
Episode List at TVGuide.com

Lists of American teen drama television series episodes
Episodes